Eldoradoville was a gold mining town in Los Angeles County, located in the San Gabriel Mountains.  Established in 1859, Eldoradoville at its peak population had three stores and six saloons.  It was washed away on January 18, 1862, in the Great Flood of 1862.

The site of Eldoradoville is on the East Fork of the San Gabriel River, on the north side of East Fork Road, where the Eldoradoville Campground is located at an elevation of 1866 ft.

References

External links
  MICHAEL WARREN, California’s First Gold Rush from www.goldgold.com
  East Fork always wins in battle with man, San Bernardino Sun, 01/05/2009

Former settlements in Los Angeles County, California
Former populated places in California
Populated places established in 1859
1859 establishments in California